Mercantile capitalism may refer to:

Merchant capitalism
Mercantilism